The Last Pope (original: O Último Papa) is a novel by Portuguese author Luís Miguel Rocha, released in 2006.

It is a thriller set thirty years after the death of Pope John Paul I, in which a journalist, Sarah Monteiro, receives menaces  connected with the secrets of Vatican City and the Italian secret lodge Propaganda 2.
The book focus on the strange death of Pope John Paul I. According to the plot, he was murdered because he was about to replace members of the Holy See that were involved in money laundering business with the Masonic Lodge P2.

External links
Luis Miguel Rocha's Official website 
nome de Deus (the death of John Paul I under the eyes of the controversial British journalist David Yallop)
/O Último Papa" editado na Indonésia - RTP (website of the Portuguese channel RTP that talks about the books, focusing on the many editions of the book around the world.)

2006 novels
Catholic novels
Novels about journalists
Novels set in Vatican City
21st-century Portuguese novels
Thriller novels